The Douglas River, formerly known as the Twain, is a river of the West Coast of New Zealand's South Island. The Douglas River's entire course is within Westland Tai Poutini National Park. The river and glacier are named after Charles Edward Douglas, a 19th-century explorer and mountaineer.

The New Zealand Department of Conservation maintains a backcountry hut at the junction of the Douglas and Horace Walker rivers.

See also
List of rivers of New Zealand

References

Land Information New Zealand - Search for Place Names

Westland District
Rivers of the West Coast, New Zealand
Westland Tai Poutini National Park
Rivers of New Zealand